Patrick Gaillard (born 12 February 1952 in Paris)  is a former racing driver from France.  He participated in 5 World Championship Formula One Grands Prix, debuting on 1 July 1979. He scored no championship points.

After performing well in French Formula Renault and Formula 3, Gaillard moved into Formula 2 in 1979, the same year as he drove for Ensign in Formula 1. The Ensign N179 was not a good car and Gaillard struggled on occasions, failing to qualify three times out of five, before being dropped in favour of Marc Surer.

In 1980 Gaillard returned to Ensign for the Spanish Grand Prix and finished in a points-paying 6th place—the last of 6 cars still running at the finish, 5 laps down. However, the result did not count as this race was subsequently downgraded to non-Championship status due to the FISA–FOCA war (F1 sporting body versus the F1 manufacturers), making Gaillard's only point nullified.

Thereafter he drove in Formula 2, CanAm, and sports cars including the 24 Hours of Le Mans before retiring.  He later became a racing instructor.

Complete Formula One World Championship results
(key) (Races in bold indicate pole position)

Sources
Profile at www.grandprix.com

French racing drivers
French Formula One drivers
Ensign Formula One drivers
European Formula Two Championship drivers
1952 births
Living people
Racing drivers from Paris
24 Hours of Le Mans drivers
World Sportscar Championship drivers